Douglas Nicol Anderson (25 March 1914 – 9 November 1989) was a Scottish professional football left back who played in the Football League and Scottish League.

Career statistics

References

Scottish footballers
English Football League players
Brentford F.C. players
People from Stonehaven
Association football fullbacks
Aberdeen F.C. players
Dundee United F.C. players
Scottish Football League players
Hibernian F.C. players
1914 births
1989 deaths
Stonehaven F.C. players
Derry City F.C. players
Brentford F.C. wartime guest players
Aberdeen F.C. wartime guest players
Falkirk F.C. players
Footballers from Aberdeenshire
Falkirk F.C. wartime guest players
Aldershot F.C. wartime guest players
Blackburn Rovers F.C. wartime guest players
Wrexham F.C. wartime guest players
New Brighton A.F.C. wartime guest players